Sillery may refer to:

Places
Sillery, Quebec City, a former municipality, today a district of Quebec City, Canada
Sillery, Marne, a commune in Marne, France

People with the name
Noël Brûlart de Sillery (1577–1640), French diplomat, Knight of Malta and religious figure after whom the district in Quebec is named
Pierre Brulart, marquis de Sillery (1583–1640), Foreign minister of France under Louis XIII
Fabio Brulart de Sillery (1655–1714), French churchman, bishop of Avranches and bishop of Soissons

Fiction
 A recurring character in the novel sequence A Dance to the Music of Time by Anthony Powell.